Piratas de Sudamérica, Vol. 1 is the debut extended play (EP) by Spanish musician el Guincho. It was released on 12 July 2010 by Young Turks.

Track listing
Credits adapted from Tidal.

References

2010 debut EPs
El Guincho albums
Young Turks (record label) albums